The  is an electric multiple unit (EMU) train type operated in Japan by the private railway operator Hankyu Railway since 2003.

Operations
The 8-car 9300 series trains operate on the Hankyu Kyoto Main Line, primarily on limited express services.

Formations
As of 1 April 2012, the fleet consisted of eleven eight-car sets formed as follows, with three motored (M) cars and five non-powered trailer (T) cars.

The "Mc1" and "M1" cars are fitted with two single-arm pantographs.

Interior
Passenger accommodation consists of transverse seating, with longitudinal bench seating at the car ends.

References

External links

 Hankyu 9300 series (Japan Railfan Magazine Online) 

Electric multiple units of Japan
9300 series
Hitachi multiple units
Train-related introductions in 2003
1500 V DC multiple units of Japan
Alna Sharyo rolling stock